North Wall was one of Dublin's six original rail termini, the others being Westland Row (now Pearse Station), Amiens Street (now Connolly Station), Kingsbridge (now Heuston Station), Broadstone and Harcourt Street (now a bar and nightclub complex).

History
The London and North Western Railway (LNWR) moved the Dublin terminus of their passenger service from Kingstown (Dún Laoghaire) to North Wall in 1861.  The railway passenger station was then opened and was only used for boat trains.

The passenger service to the railway station closed in 1922.

As of 2020 the station and adjoining lands were reserved for use as a possible station on the DART Underground alongside the Spencer Dock Luas stop.

London and North Western Hotel

The LNWR also opened an adjacent hotel in 1884.  It was closed in 1922 and then was subsequently used for offices.

Freight Depot

The associated freight depot remains actively in use through many of its constituent yards have closed from the 1970s.  North Wall in a freight context will refer to the freight yard.

References

Dublin Docklands
Disused railway stations in County Dublin
North Wall, Dublin
Railway stations opened in 1877
1877 establishments in Ireland
Railway stations closed in 1922
1922 disestablishments in Ireland
Railway stations in the Republic of Ireland opened in the 19th century